Montserrat González Benítez (born 1 July 1994) is a Paraguayan former tennis player.

In her career, she won eleven singles and eight doubles titles on the ITF Women's Circuit. On 12 September 2016, she reached her best singles ranking of world No. 150. On 29 August 2016, she peaked at No. 210 in the doubles rankings.

Playing for Paraguay Fed Cup team, González has a win–loss record of 42–20 in Fed Cup competitions.

She announced retirement from professional tennis in 2021.

ITF Circuit finals

Singles: 18 (11 titles, 7 runner–ups)

Doubles: 16 (8 titles, 8 runner–ups)

Junior Grand Slam finals

Girls' doubles

Notes

References

External links

 
 
 

1994 births
Living people
Sportspeople from Asunción
Paraguayan female tennis players
Tennis players at the 2015 Pan American Games
South American Games gold medalists for Paraguay
South American Games silver medalists for Paraguay
South American Games medalists in tennis
Competitors at the 2014 South American Games
Competitors at the 2018 South American Games
Pan American Games medalists in tennis
Pan American Games silver medalists for Paraguay
Tennis players at the 2019 Pan American Games
Medalists at the 2019 Pan American Games
21st-century Paraguayan women